The list of United States hurricanes includes all tropical cyclones officially recorded to have produced sustained winds of greater than  in the United States, which is the minimum threshold for hurricane intensity. The list, which is sorted by U.S. state, begins in 1851 with the start of the official Atlantic hurricane database (HURDAT), as provided by the National Oceanic and Atmospheric Administration's Hurricane Research Division. Since 1851, a total of 303 North Atlantic hurricanes produced hurricane-force winds in 19 states along the Atlantic coast. Some of these storms may not have made a direct landfall (i.e. remained just offshore) while producing hurricane-force winds on land; some of them may have weakened to a tropical storm or became extratropical before landfall but produced hurricane conditions on land while still a hurricane and some of them made landfall in an adjacent state but produced hurricane conditions over multiple states. This list does not include storms that only produced tropical storm conditions on land in the United States.

Additionally, three Pacific hurricanes struck Hawaii, and one Pacific tropical cyclone brought hurricane-force winds to California. The tables list hurricanes by category on the Saffir–Simpson hurricane scale, based on winds that occurred in each state.

Statistics

, a total of 303 Atlantic tropical cyclones have produced hurricane-force winds in every state along the Atlantic Ocean and Gulf of Mexico (as well as Pennsylvania), with Florida having had more hurricanes affecting it than any other state.

The earliest time in the year for a hurricane (and a major hurricane) to strike the nation was June 9, which was set by Alma in 1966. The earliest major hurricane (category 3 or greater) to make an actual landfall in the nation occurred in 1957, when Hurricane Audrey made landfall at category 3 intensity on June 27. The latest in the year for a hurricane to strike the nation was on November 24 with Hurricane Iwa in Hawaii; for the Atlantic basin the latest was on November 22, which was set by Hurricane Kate in 1985. The latest in the year for a major hurricane to strike the nation was from Hurricane Zeta, which moved ashore on October 28.

The 1990s were the most active decade for the United States, with a total of 31 hurricanes affecting the nation. By contrast, the least active decade was the 1860s and 1970s, each with a total of only 15 hurricanes affecting the United States. A total of 33 seasons on record passed without an Atlantic hurricane affecting the country — the most recent of which was the 2015 season. Seven Atlantic hurricanes affected the country in the 1886 season, which was the year with the most United States hurricanes.

Impact
The 1935 Labor Day hurricane was the most intense hurricane to make landfall on the country, having struck the Florida Keys with a pressure of 892 mbar. It was one of only seven hurricanes to move ashore as a Category 5 hurricane on the Saffir–Simpson hurricane scale; the others were "Okeechobee" in 1928, Karen in 1962, Camille in 1969, Andrew in 1992, Michael in 2018, and Yutu in 2018, which had a landfalling pressure of 931 mbar, 932 mbar, 900 mbar, 922 mbar, 919 mbar, and 900 mbar, respectively. Hurricane Michael in 2018 was the fourth most intense hurricane to strike the country with a pressure of 919 mbar, while hurricanes Katrina in 2005 and Maria in 2017 are tied as the fifth most intense hurricanes to strike the country, each with a pressure of 920 mbar.

The 1900 Galveston hurricane was the deadliest hurricane in the history of the United States, killing between 6,000 and 12,000 people. 2017s Hurricane Maria resulted in at least 2,982 fatalities. The 1928 Okeechobee hurricane caused at least 2,500 fatalities, and in 2005, Hurricane Katrina killed approximately 1,800 people. In the 1893 season, two hurricanes each caused over 1,000 deaths.

Not accounting for inflation, a total of fifteen Atlantic hurricanes have resulted in over US$10 billion in damage, including three each from the 2004, 2005, and 2017 seasons, respectively. The costliest hurricanes were Katrina in 2005 and Harvey in 2017, both with uninflated damage totals amounting to US$125 billion. Of the 41 Atlantic hurricanes with damages exceeding $1.01 billion after accounting for inflation (2017 dollars), 20 have occurred after the year 2000, though this list does not include 2018's Michael nor Florence.

List of states

The category listed for each state indicates the maximum category of sustained winds that were recorded or analyzed to have occurred in that state. It is not necessarily the category of the storm at the time of landfall or closest approach (if the strongest winds were occurring elsewhere or only over water at the time).

Alabama

Connecticut

Delaware

Florida

Georgia

Louisiana

Maine

Maryland

Massachusetts

Mississippi

New Hampshire

New Jersey

Although Hurricane Sandy struck the state in October 2012 and produced hurricane-force winds, it became an extratropical cyclone before landfall or producing any hurricane-strength winds.

New York

North Carolina

Pennsylvania

Though not directly bordering the Atlantic Ocean, the Gale of 1878 produced hurricane-force winds in the state, the only tropical cyclone on record to do so.
Furthermore, Hurricane Agnes (1972) had a severe impact on the state. Although it had been only a Category 1 storm, and had weakened to a tropical depression by the time it reached Pennsylvania, Hurricane Agnes nevertheless caused severe flooding, as well as enormous economic damage.

Rhode Island

South Carolina

Texas

Virginia

States bordering the Pacific Ocean

Southwestern United States

The 1858 San Diego hurricane is the only Pacific tropical cyclone known to have produced hurricane-force winds in California; it affected San Diego on October 2, 1858, though its center remained just offshore. In the 20th century, only four tropical cyclones produced tropical storm force winds in the southwestern United States: a tropical storm in September 1939 in California, Hurricane Joanne in October 1972 in Arizona, Hurricane Kathleen in September 1976 in Arizona and California, and Hurricane Nora in September 1997 in Arizona.

Hawaii

Note: This section only includes tropical cyclones that occurred during or after 1900, when Hawaii was acquired by the United StatesThis section does not include tropical cyclones that affected the Northwestern Hawaiian Islands

U.S. territories

American Samoa
Note: This section only includes tropical cyclones that occurred during or after 1900, when American Samoa was acquired by the United States

Guam
Note: This section only includes tropical cyclones that occurred during or after 1899, when Guam was acquired by the United States

Northern Mariana Islands
Note: This section only includes tropical cyclones that occurred during or after 1986, when the Northern Mariana Islands were acquired by the United StatesThis section only includes tropical cyclones that affected the main islands of Saipan, Tinian, and Rota

Puerto Rico
Note: This section only includes tropical cyclones that occurred during or after 1899, when Puerto Rico was acquired by the United States

United States Virgin Islands
Note: This section only includes tropical cyclones that occurred during or after 1917, when the United States Virgin Islands were acquired by the United States

Climatological statistics

See also

 Climate of the United States
 List of Atlantic hurricanes
Historical Hurricane Tracks Viewer

Notes

References

External links
 Chronological List of All Hurricanes which Affected the Continental United States: 1851-2012

 
Hurricanes